The following lists events that happened during 1971 in Rhodesia.

Incumbents
 President: Clifford Dupont 
 Prime Minister: Ian Smith

Events

June
30 June - Arnold Goodman, a British special envoy arrives in Rhodesia for talks with the Rhodesian government

November
15 November - Alec Douglas-Home, the British Foreign Secretary, arrives in Salisbury to discuss settlement proposals
24 November - Ian Smith, Rhodesian Prime Minister, and Alec Douglas-Home sign an agreement setting out proposals for settlement

December
16 December - The African National Council is set up as a temporary non-political body under Bishop Abel Muzorewa to oppose the settlement terms.

Births
 May 24 — Cephas Matafi, long-distance runner

References

 
Years of the 20th century in Zimbabwe
Zimbabwe